The name Mario has been used for one tropical cyclone in the Eastern Pacific Ocean and one in the Philippines by the PAGASA in the Western Pacific Ocean.

In the Eastern Pacific:
 Tropical Storm Mario (2019), never threatened land.

In the Western Pacific:
 Tropical Storm Fung-wong (2014) (T1416, 16W, Mario) - brushed the Northern Philippines, where it caused over ₱1 billion in damages; later landfall on Shanghai, China.

The name Mario was retired by PAGASA following the 2014 typhoon season and replaced with Maymay for the 2018 season.

Pacific typhoon set index articles
Pacific hurricane set index articles